Dapi Lake is the former name of two lakes in Taiwan:

 Jinshi Lake, Kaohsiung
 Meihua Lake, Yilan County